Colombo was an American soccer club based in Staten Island, New York that was a member of the American Soccer League.  While only in existence for one year, the team took the ASL title under the direction of player-coach, and future Hall of Famer, Jack Hynes.

Coach
 Jack Hynes
Manager
 Peter Castelli

Year-by-year

American Soccer League (1933–1983) teams
Men's soccer clubs in New York (state)
Defunct soccer clubs in New York City
1959 establishments in New York City
1960 disestablishments in New York (state)
Association football clubs established in 1959
Association football clubs disestablished in 1960
Sports in Staten Island